Gerolsheim is an Ortsgemeinde – a municipality belonging to a Verbandsgemeinde, a kind of collective municipality – in the Bad Dürkheim district in Rhineland-Palatinate, Germany.

Geography

Location 
The municipality lies in the northwest of the Rhine-Neckar urban agglomeration. It belongs to the Verbandsgemeinde of Leiningerland, which was formed in 2018, and whose seat is in Grünstadt, although that town is itself not in the Verbandsgemeinde.

History 
In 915, Gerolsheim had its first documentary mention as Geroltesheimero.

Until 1969, the municipality belonged to the now abolished district of Frankenthal. In 1972 came the amalgamation with the newly formed Verbandsgemeinde of Grünstadt-Land.

The Sondermülldeponie Gerolsheim (“Special Garbage Dump”) was closed in 2003 after decades-long efforts by residents to reach that goal.

Religion 
In 2007, 41.2% of the inhabitants were Evangelical and 29.5% Catholic. The rest belonged to other faiths or adhered to none.

Politics

Municipal council 
The council is made up of 16 council members, who were elected at the municipal election held on 7 June 2009, and the honorary mayor as chairman.

The municipal election held on 7 June 2009 yielded the following results:

Mayor 
In the mayoral election, 1,421 citizens were eligible to vote, of whom 919 actually went to the polls. Ortsbürgermeister (Mayor) Erich Weyer (FWG) was confirmed in his office with 713 votes (79.7%) against opponent Volker Rossel’s (SPD) 182 votes (20.3%).

Coat of arms 
In Rot ein dreizackiges silbernes Fischspeereisen, unten beidseits von je einer goldenen Rose mit blauen Butzen beseitet.

The municipality’s arms is described thus: In Rot ein dreizackiges silbernes Fischspeereisen, unten beidseits von je einer goldenen Rose mit blauen Butzen beseitet. It might in English heraldic language be described thus: Gules the head of a trident palewise argent, the points to chief, between two roses Or seeded azure in base.

The arms were approved in 1926 by the Bavarian State Ministry of the Interior and go back to a seal from 1541. The trident stands for the church’s patron saint, Leodegar.

Famous people

Honorary citizens 
23 October 2004 Adolf Buch, 40 years as a municipal politician, just under 25 of which as mayor
23 October 2004 Ilse Buch (Adolf Buch’s wife), 40 years of social and club work

Further reading 
 Alexander Thon: Gerolsheim. In: Jürgen Keddigkeit (Hrsg.): Pfälzisches Burgenlexikon. Beiträge zur pfälzischen Geschichte Bd. 12/2, Institut für Pfälzische Geschichte und Volkskunde, Kaiserslautern 2002, S. 130-188, .

References

External links 

 Gerolsheim in the collective municipality’s Web pages 

Bad Dürkheim (district)